Boccia competitions at the 2015 Parapan American Games in Toronto were held from August 8 to 11 at the Abilities Centre, in Whitby, Ontario. All Boccia competitions were mixed (men and women competed together equally).

Medal table

Medalists

Participating nations
A total of 8 nations qualified athletes.

2016 Summer Paralympics qualification
This event served as a ranking event for the individual events. The rankings would eventually determine who qualified for the Games.

See also
Boccia at the 2016 Summer Paralympics

References

Events at the 2015 Parapan American Games
2015